Dev  is a 2004 Indian Hindi drama film, directed by Govind Nihalani.

Plot
Joint Commissioner of Police Dev Pratap Singh, a duty-bound, self-righteous officer, and Special Commissioner Tejinder Khosla, the balancing force between the political interests of Chief Minister Bhandarker and Dev's commitment to the law, are lifelong friends, each with his own ideals. Farhaan, a law graduate, was brought up with ideals of non-violence and patriotism. Dev unwittingly gives Farhaan the wound that plunges him into rage and violence after witnessing the death of his father during a peace demonstration. Taking advantage of the situation, corrupt politician Latif sets the vulnerable young man on a path of violence and destruction that threatens to ignite the city. Aaliya is the light in Farhaan's life. Beautiful and innocent, the young woman also gets caught in extraordinary circumstances that transform her life and she dares to stand up for the truth. Dev is the saga of Dev and Tej's friendship, a bond stronger than blood ties in which Farhaan emerges as the wedge driving them apart. The story unfolds against the vitiated atmosphere of present times where innocent lives become fodder for political expediency. The spark of terrorist violence unknowingly set off by Farhaan under the aegis of the corrupt politician Latif engulfs the whole city in its flames. Tej transgresses beyond the boundaries of law in his passion to eliminate anti-national crime. Dev is faced with the spectre of the tragic human cost and a moral compulsion to act. The stakes rise beyond self-interest. Dev and Tej are set on a path of dramatic collision. Even as Dev and Farhaan's fates become irreversibly linked, two soldiers whose allegiance may be to different causes but admiration for each other's courage and integrity brings them together.

On a train bound for Bombay from Surat, a Police Inspector questions a young man named Farhaan, who has just obtained his law degree, for his reason to go to Bombay, and whether he has any alliance with Pakistanis. Farhaan answers that he is going to Bombay to live with his father, and he does not know anyone from Pakistan. Farhaan finds out that Bombay Police have been targeting the Muslim community, and in the name of fighting terrorism, have been killing innocent Muslim men, women and children. He discovers that Joint Commissioner of Police, Dev Pratap Singh, is involved in this witch-hunt, and he would like to kill him. Farhaan joins hands with the local Muslim political leader, Latif, and he is provided training in handling guns, and is subsequently made ready for this task. Unfortunately, Farhaan is unable to kill Dev, who escapes unhurt, albeit a little shaken. Chief Minister Bhandarkar views this incident seriously, and instructs the police to root out terrorist elements in the city, which they do so ruthlessly. Farhaan is told to deliver a package to a man near a Hindu temple, and he does so. While at a stop to buy some snacks, the package explodes, killing several people. Since this incident occurred near a Hindu temple, a right-wing political party member, Mangal Rao, organizes riots against the Muslim community. Riots take place, and the police are instructed to observe and not prevent the violence. As a result, hundreds are killed. Latif organizes his men to target and attack Hindus and Hindu establishments, rendering the region unsafe, with people being killed in the name of religion. When Hindus and Muslims have had enough, they publicly ask for peace, it is only then Latif and Mangal Rao agree on a truce, on the condition that no Muslim male, female or child will file a FIR (First Information Report) in any police station, to which Latif agrees. Latif then warns everyone in the Muslim community not to complain against anyone. Period. It is then Farhaan finds out that he has been treated as a pawn by Latif, and decides to trust Dev and become an informer.

Cast
 Amitabh Bachchan as JCP Dev Pratap Singh
 Kareena Kapoor as Aaliya
 Fardeen Khan as Farhaan Ali
 Om Puri as Special Commissioner Tejinder Khosla
 Amrish Puri as Chief Minister Bhandarker
 Ehsan Khan as Latif Bhai
 Rati Agnihotri as Dr. Bharati Singh
 Milind Gunaji as Mangal Rao
 Pramod Moutho as Ali Khan
 Amruta Subhash as Qureshi
 Rajesh Tailang as ACP Waman Bhonsle

Awards  

 50th Filmfare Awards:

Won

 Best Film (Critics) – Govind Nihalani
 Best Actress (Critics) – Kareena Kapoor

Soundtrack

The soundtrack features 7 songs composed by Aadesh Shrivastav, with lyrics by Nida Fazli and Govind Nihalani.

Track listing
"Rang Deeni" (4:31) – Kailash Kher, Shraddha Pandit, Mahua Kamat
"Jab Nahin Aaye The" (4:52) – Vijayta Pandit
"Allahu" (6:27) – Aadesh Srivastav, Asha Bhosle
"Tujh Sang Bandhi" (4:35) – Sonu Nigam
"Jab Nahin Aaye The" (4:05) – Kareena Kapoor 
"Manglam Ganesham" (4:32) – Abhijeet
"Dev Speaks" (3:07) – Amitabh Bachchan

References

External links
 
 

2000s Hindi-language films
2004 films
Films about corruption in India
Films scored by Aadesh Shrivastava
Fictional portrayals of the Maharashtra Police
Films directed by Govind Nihalani
Films about religious violence in India

pl:Dev